An impaired asset is an asset which has a market value less than the value listed on its owner's balance sheet.

According to U.S. accounting rules (known as US GAAP), the value of an asset is impaired when the sum of estimated future cash flows from that asset is less than its book value. At this point an impairment loss should be recognized, which is done by taking the difference between the fair market value (FMV) and the book value and recording this amount as the loss. This basically records the asset as if it were being acquired brand new at its FMV, recording this as its new book value. This is a common occurrence for goodwill where a company will purchase a target company for more than the value of its net assets. Under US GAAP, goodwill is tested annually for impairment.

See also
Lower of cost or market

References

United States Generally Accepted Accounting Principles
Asset